Cyber Centurion is a cyber security competition for school children from the age of 12, run in the United Kingdom by Cyber Security Challenge UK. It mirrors CyberPatriot, the US version run by the Air Force Association. Cyber Centurion is sponsored by Northrop Grumman in an initiative to try to build awareness for cyber security among school children.

History 
Cyber Centurion was set up in 2014 after the success of its US counterpart CyberPatriot and its first final took place at The National Museum of Computing on 17 April 2015. The main aim of Cyber Centurion is the same as its US counterpart; to excite, educate and motivate children towards careers in STEM subjects, with an emphasis on Cyber Security. It is also due to the large deficit in Cyber Security professionals. Northrop Grumman, the sponsors of both CyberPatriot and CyberCenturion hope that it will inspire youths towards choosing Cyber Security as a career.

Competition format

Tracks and categories 
CyberCenturion is split into two age categories, each with four 'tracks'. This is done to encourage more diversity in the competition. The younger age category is for 12–14-year-olds and the older category is for 15–18-year-olds.

Within the age categories, the tracks split teams into four more groups, with a boys-only track, a girls-only track, a mixed team track and a cadet track.

Places for the final are awarded in the following number of ways:
 "12-14 category: one place for the top team of each category (girls, boys, mixed and cadets) and the highest scoring team from all tracks combined" 
 "15-18 category: one place for the top team of each category (girls, boys, mixed and cadets) and the highest six scoring teams from all tracks combined"

Rounds 
There are four main rounds with Rounds 1, 2 and 3 being online qualifying rounds where "teams will be provided with a mixture of Windows and Linux virtual machines with the aim to find and fix the vulnerabilities along with answering forensics questions".

Round 4 is the National Finals round, where qualifying teams compete face to face in London to win the top prize.

Prior to the four main rounds, there are four other 'introductory' rounds where teams play but do not score any points. These are as follows:

 Exhibition Round 1
 Exhibition Round 2
 Training Round
 Practice Technical Round

General rules 
"The competition is played by teams of between four and six people. Each team must include a responsible adult as the liaison between the organisers and the participants, and every team participant must be 18 years old or under when the game is played. The competition is open to anyone in Europe that meets the age requirements and has the correct team format (including leader). Each team must play a series of online qualifying rounds, which will challenge them to learn about networking, coding and cyber security. If the team scores higher than most of the other players and makes it to the leaderboard, then they will be invited to play in the National Final, a face-to-face competition which finds the ultimate champion for the year."

The Qualification Competition starts as soon as the virtual image is booted and ends 6 hours later. The score is logged regularly and a live scoreboard is released during the competition to competitors. Breaching the time limit will result in penalties.
 Only a single instance of the image may be opened at one time.

Previous winners and finals 
In CyberCenturion I, the finals were held in Block H, the original home of Colossus, of The National Museum of Computing in April 2015, with KEGS Young Engineering Club at King Edward VI Grammar School in Chelmsford becoming the first CyberCenturion winners and The Chase School, Malvern being the runners up.

In CyberCenturion II, the finals were held at The National Museum of Computing in April 2016, with "G-Sec" from Bayside Comprehensive School, Gibraltar being first-place winners, and the only team from overseas territories to currently have won Cyber Centurion. The top prize was technology equipment to promote help promote STEM in their school.

In CyberCenturion III, the finals were held at the Institution of Engineering and & Technology in the Maxwell Library in April 2017.
 The team "SPS 'B'" from St Paul’s School, London were the first-place winners, winning a selection of prizes; from books for their school, to a unique piece print of a letter from Churchill and lunch with the senior members of Northrop Grumman Corporation and Cyber Security Challenge UK.
 "SPS 'A'", another team from St Paul's School, London, were also the second-place winners.
 Team CyberMen, from King Edward VI Grammar School, Chelmsford, were the third-place winners.

In CyberCenturion IV, the finals were held at the Institution of Engineering & Technology in March 2018.
 "You really can't 'c' me", from St George’s School Edgbaston in Birmingham, were the first-place winners, winning the prize of an all-expenses paid trip to the United States.
 Second place winners were "Saved by Bell" from St Paul’s School, Barnes
 Third place winners were "Vault 7" from Frome College.
 There were also awards for top all-boys, mixed, all-girls and cadets teams. The all-boys team were from St. George's School Edgbaston, the mixed team were from St. Paul's School, Barnes, the all-girls team were from Bayside Comprehensive School, Gibraltar and the cadet team were from Sandbach School Combined Cadet Force.

The CyberCenturion VII finals took place virtually in 2021, due to the ongoing Covid-19 pandemic.
 Senior second places winners were the Isle of Man Code Club team, "CyberAces".
 Junior third places winners were "Somebody" from Bayside School in Gibraltar.

2022 saw CyberCenturion VIII go ahead, wherein the finals took place in the Hendon Royal Airforce Museum.
 "CyberAces", from the Isle of Man Code Club, won 1st place in the senior's division, winning the competition for the 2nd time (after having won the junior category in 2019 ).
 "The Toast Mine of Cookies", also from the Manx Code Club, came 2nd in the junior's division.

See also 

 List of computer science awards

References

External links
 Previously
 

Computer science competitions